The Windy City Bluez were a W-League club based in Palos Hills, Illinois, USA. The team folded after the 2004 season.

Year-by-year

Women's soccer clubs in the United States
Soccer clubs in Chicago
Soccer clubs in Illinois
Defunct USL W-League (1995–2015) teams
2004 disestablishments in Illinois
2003 establishments in Illinois
Association football clubs established in 2003
Association football clubs disestablished in 2004
Women's sports in Illinois
Women in Chicago